Loensia fasciata is a species of Psocoptera from the Psocidae family that can be found in Great Britain and Ireland. The species are yellowish-black.

Habitat 
The species feed on alder, ash, aspen, beech, cedar, hawthorn, hazel, oak, pine, sycamore, and yew. It also likes apples.

References 

Psocidae
Insects described in 1787
Psocoptera of Europe